Anzhengxia is a genus of flowering plants belonging to the family Brassicaceae.

Its native range is Northwestern China.

Species:

Anzhengxia yechengnica

References

Brassicaceae
Brassicaceae genera